Borovo is a village in Gotse Delchev Municipality, in Blagoevgrad Province, Bulgaria. There are no industries in it, but the land is arable and fertile. The village has a post office. The medical care is provided by a general practitioner. The primary school "Kliment Ohridski" is responsible for the education of the children from the village. An amateur football club "Pirin-Barsa" is playing in the provincial league.

References

Villages in Blagoevgrad Province